Arnold Frolows (born 1950) is an Australian radio personality best known as music director at the Australian radio station Triple J.

Frolows started his career in music in 1970, as a manager of Virgin record stores in London.  After returning to Australia in late 1974 he was hired as one of the foundation staff of Double Jay in Sydney, which began broadcasting in January 1975.  He managed the record library and programming of the station.  He temporarily returned to the United Kingdom where he was, among other things, head of A&R, at Virgin Records UK.

In 1983, he re-joined Triple J  where he took on the role of music director, a position that he held until his retirement from the station in 2003. During this time he also hosted Ambience, a program focussing on ambient music until the late 1980s. During his last few years at the station, he was criticised in the music media as being "too old" to work at a youth station.

After leaving Triple J, Frolows remained with the ABC to become a programmer for the new digital radio station ABC DiG,
then Music Director at ABC JAZZ.

References

1950 births
Living people
Triple J announcers